Double 'F' (Friday Films) is a series of TV Movies shown on The History Channel in India, that premiered on 12 May 2006.

List of films:

Marilyn & Me
Escape From Sobibor
Saving Jessica Lynch
Hostages
Advance to Ground Zero
In His Life:John Lennon
The Perfect Tribute
Hefner

Indian television series
History (American TV channel) original programming